Rupert Besley is a British illustrator working since 1980, best known for nearly 400 postcard illustrations for J. Arthur Dixon and later John Hinde. He also illustrated cartoon panels for Isle of Wight County Press.

Bibliography
Besley's Britain 
Scotland for Beginners 
Isle of Skye for Beginners 
Ireland for Beginners, Or, Get Lost in Ireland, 1994
'Haud Yer Wheesht!': Your Scottish Granny's Favourite Sayings 1997
Whaur's Yer Wullie Shakespeare Noo?': Scotland's Millennium Souvenir 1999
'Ye Cannae Shove Yer Granny Aff a Bus!': Scots Grandchildren on Their Grannies, 1999
Dead Jammy!: The Life and Deaths of Glasgow Undertaker Jammy Stewart, 2004
Scotland for Beginners: 1314 An' A' That 2007
Terribly English: A Guide for Baffled Natives and Bookish Visitors 2012
You Know You Are a Dog Lover..., 2013
The Cannae Sutra: The Scots 'Joy of Sex' 2017
Awa' an' Bile Yer Heid!: Scottish Curses and Insults, 2017

See also
Charles Grigg
Donald McGill

References

External links
Rupert Besley - cartoonist

Postcard artists
Living people
Year of birth missing (living people)